EAP or E.A.P. may refer to:

 East Asia and the Pacific

Organizations
 Bureau of East Asian and Pacific Affairs, of the United States Department of State
 E.A. Patras, a Greek sports club
 Eastern Partnership, a proposed initiative in the European Union
 Endangered Archives Programme at the British Library
 Engineers Against Poverty
 European Association for Psychotherapy
 European Workers Party
 Hellenic Open University, in Patras, Greece
 EAP, a business school which merged with ESCP to become ESCP Europe
 ICC East Asia-Pacific, of the International Cricket Council

Science and technology
 British Aerospace EAP, a fighter aircraft technology demonstrator
 Electroactive polymers

Computing
 Enterprise access point, a cross-vendor marketing name for wireless access points with features for enterprises and large networks.
 Enterprise architecture planning
 Extensible Authentication Protocol
 JBoss Enterprise Application Platform
 Early Access Program

Other uses
 Edgar Allan Poe
 Emergency Action Plan, part of Emergency management
 Emergency action principles
 Employee assistance program
 English for academic purposes
 EuroAirport Basel Mulhouse Freiburg, in Blotzheim, France

See also
 University of California Education Abroad Program (UCEAP)